Agelaus or Agelaos (Ancient Greek: Ἀγέλαος) is, in Greek mythology, the name of various individuals.

Agelaus, father of Antheus of Lyctus. He fought in the army of Dionysus during his campaigns in India.
Agelaus, an Arcadian prince as the son of King Stymphalus. He was the father of Phalanthus.
Agelaus, also Ageleus, a Calydonian princes as the son of King Oeneus and Queen Althaea. 
Agelaus, son of Heracles and Omphale, and ancestor of Croesus. In other sources this son is instead called Lamus.
Agelaus, a common herdsman (or slave of Priam) who saved the life of the Trojan prince Paris, exposed as an infant on Mount Ida, owing to a prophecy that he would be the reason for the destruction of Troy, and brought him up as his own son.
Agelaus, son of Maion. He was a Trojan warrior and killed, during the Trojan War, by Ajax.
Agelaus of Miletus, son of Hippasus. He fought against the Greeks as part of contingent of Nastes in the Trojan War and was killed by Meges.
Agelaus, son of Phradmon, and a Trojan warrior. He was killed during the war by Diomedes.
Agelaus, son of Evanor, and one of the attendants of Acamas during the Trojan War.
Agelaus, a Greek warrior slain by Hector during the Trojan War.
Agelaus, or Agelaos, son of Damastor and one of the Suitors of Penelope who came from Same along with other 22 wooers. He, with the other suitors, was shot dead by Odysseus with the aid of Eumaeus, Philoetius, and Telemachus.
Agelaus, son of Temenus and descendant of Heracles. Agelaus, along with his brothers (Eurypylus and Callias), hired men to kill his father, since he gave his favour to their sister Hyrnetho and her husband Deiphontes. When this was discovered, the people gave the throne to Deiphontes and Hyrnetho.

Notes

References 

 Apollodorus, The Library with an English Translation by Sir James George Frazer, F.B.A., F.R.S. in 2 Volumes, Cambridge, MA, Harvard University Press; London, William Heinemann Ltd. 1921. ISBN 0-674-99135-4. Online version at the Perseus Digital Library. Greek text available from the same website.
Hesiod, Catalogue of Women from Homeric Hymns, Epic Cycle, Homerica translated by Evelyn-White, H G. Loeb Classical Library Volume 57. London: William Heinemann, 1914. Online version at theio.com
 Homer, The Iliad with an English Translation by A.T. Murray, Ph.D. in two volumes. Cambridge, MA., Harvard University Press; London, William Heinemann, Ltd. 1924. . Online version at the Perseus Digital Library.
Homer, Homeri Opera in five volumes. Oxford, Oxford University Press. 1920. . Greek text available at the Perseus Digital Library.
 Nonnus of Panopolis, Dionysiaca translated by William Henry Denham Rouse (1863-1950), from the Loeb Classical Library, Cambridge, MA, Harvard University Press, 1940.  Online version at the Topos Text Project.
Nonnus of Panopolis, Dionysiaca. 3 Vols. W.H.D. Rouse. Cambridge, MA., Harvard University Press; London, William Heinemann, Ltd. 1940-1942. Greek text available at the Perseus Digital Library.
Pausanias, Description of Greece with an English Translation by W.H.S. Jones, Litt.D., and H.A. Ormerod, M.A., in 4 Volumes. Cambridge, MA, Harvard University Press; London, William Heinemann Ltd. 1918. . Online version at the Perseus Digital Library
Pausanias, Graeciae Descriptio. 3 vols. Leipzig, Teubner. 1903.  Greek text available at the Perseus Digital Library.
Quintus Smyrnaeus, The Fall of Troy translated by Way. A. S. Loeb Classical Library Volume 19. London: William Heinemann, 1913. Online version at theio.com
 Quintus Smyrnaeus, The Fall of Troy. Arthur S. Way. London: William Heinemann; New York: G.P. Putnam's Sons. 1913. Greek text available at the Perseus Digital Library.

External links
 

Children of Heracles
Achaeans (Homer)
Trojans
Characters in the Odyssey
Suitors of Penelope
Dionysus in mythology
Arcadian mythology